Bloomington is a city in and the county seat of Monroe County, Indiana, United States. It is the seventh-largest city in Indiana and the fourth-largest outside the Indianapolis metropolitan area. According to the Monroe County History Center, Bloomington is known as the "Gateway to Scenic Southern Indiana". The city was established in 1818 by a group of settlers from Kentucky, Tennessee, the Carolinas, and Virginia who were so impressed with "a haven of blooms" that they called it Bloomington.

The population was 79,168 at the 2020 census.

Bloomington is the home to Indiana University Bloomington, the flagship campus of the IU System. Established in 1820, IU Bloomington has 45,328 students, as of September 2021, and is the original and largest campus of Indiana University. Most of the campus buildings are built of Indiana limestone.

Bloomington has been designated a Tree City since 1984. The city was also the location of the Academy Award–winning 1979 movie Breaking Away, featuring a reenactment of Indiana University's annual Little 500 bicycle race.

History

The area in which Bloomington is situated was previously inhabited by the Delaware, Potawatomi, Miami, and Eel River Miami. 

Bloomington was platted in 1818. A post office has been in operation at Bloomington since 1825. Bloomington was incorporated in 1827.

The current city logo was adopted on January 6, 1986, by the Bloomington Common Council. It was a combination of peony and trout lily, inspired by both quilt patterns used by regional folk artists in 19th century and the shape of Downtown Square.

The Elias Abel House, Blair-Dunning House, Bloomington City Hall, Bloomington West Side Historic District, Cantol Wax Company Building, Coca-Cola Bottling Plant, Cochran-Helton-Lindley House, Courthouse Square Historic District, Hinkle-Garton Farmstead, Home Laundry Company, Illinois Central Railroad Freight Depot, Johnson's Creamery, Legg House, Millen House, Millen-Chase-McCalla House, Monroe Carnegie Library, Monroe County Courthouse, Morgan House, J.L. Nichols House and Studio, North Washington Street Historic District, The Old Crescent, Princess Theatre, Prospect Hill Historic District, Second Baptist Church, Seminary Square Park, Steele Dunning Historic District, University Courts Historic District, Vinegar Hill Historic District, Wicks Building, Woolery Stone Company, and Andrew Wylie House are listed on the National Register of Historic Places.

Many African Americans moved to Bloomington from Virginia, North Carolina, South Carolina, Ohio, Tennesseee and Kentucky during the 1860s through the 1880s. Bloomington also attracted Scotch Irish Presbyterians from South Carolina.

Geography

Climate

Southern Indiana receives an abundance of rain, with a yearly average of nearly 50 inches.

Geology
Bloomington is an area of irregular limestone terrain characterized by sinks, ravines, fissures, underground streams, sinking streams, springs and caves. It is in the rolling hills of southern Indiana, resting on the intersection of the Norman Uplands and the Mitchell Plain. The city's relatively varied topography is a sharp contrast to the flatter terrain more typical of central to northern portions of Indiana.

Water

Bloomington is on comparatively high ground, the summit of the divide between the basins of the West Fork and East Fork of Indiana's White River. Accordingly, there are no major watercourses within the city, nor is much groundwater available for wells. The largest stream within the city is Clear Creek, with its eastern branch known on the Indiana University campus as "The Campus River".

Due to the absence of either natural lakes or rivers or groundwater in or near the city, a number of dams have been constructed on nearby creeks over the last 100 years to provide for the water needs of Bloomington and Monroe County. Early 20th-century damming projects occurred at locations southwest of the city, the most notable being the Leonard Springs Dam. Due to the limestone formations underlying the reservoirs and the dams, water kept seeping from the reservoirs through naturally developing underground channels. Despite all efforts, the city was never able to fully stop the leakage and had to resort to pumping leaking water back to the reservoir.

By the 1920s, a more radical solution was needed to deal with the water crisis. A new reservoir, known as Griffy Lake, was constructed in a more geologically suitable area north of the city. (It is now within Bloomington's official city limits.) Later, in the 1950s, two much larger reservoirs, Lake Lemon and Monroe Lake were created in the northeastern and southeastern parts of Monroe County. Monroe Lake was created by the US Army Corps of Engineers for flood control but has since been used to supply the city and the county with water. The water pumping station at Griffy Lake was mothballed until May 2020.

Presently, the city is supplied with drinking water from Monroe Lake, via the Monroe Water Treatment Plant on S. Shields Ridge Rd. Originally opened in 1967, it was expanded in 2014, and now is capable of producing 30 million gallons of water per day. The sewer water from the northern part of the city is treated at the Blucher Poole Wastewater Treatment Plant (constructed 1968) and discharged into the Bean Blossom Creek. The sewer water from the southern half of the city goes to Dillman Road Wastewater Treatment Plant (constructed 1982) and is then discharged into the Clear Creek.

Environment
PCB pollution, associated with Westinghouse's operations, long was a concern in the area. A number of sites, in particular, Bennett's Dump and Lemon Lane Landfill at the northwestern edge of the city and Neal's Landfill in the county, were listed as Superfund sites. Clean-up operations at the Bennett Quarry site, started in 1983, were largely completed by 2000., while cleanups at the other sites were completed in 2012.

Demographics

Bloomington is the principal city of the Bloomington Metropolitan Statistical Area, a metropolitan area that covers Greene, Monroe, and Owen counties and had a combined population of 192,714 at the 2010 census.

2010 census
As of the 2010 census, there were 80,405 people, 31,425 households, and 11,267 families residing in the city. The racial makeup of the city was 83.0% White, 4.6% African American, 0.3% Native American, 8.0% Asian, 0.1% Pacific Islander, 1.2% from other races, and 3.0% from two or more races. Hispanic or Latino of any race were 3.5% of the population.

There were 31,425 households, of which 16.6% had children under the age of 18 living with them, 25.3% were married couples living together, 7.5% had a female householder with no husband present, 3.1% had a male householder with no wife present, and 64.1% were non-families. 38.2% of all households were made up of individuals, and 7.5% had someone living alone who was 65 years of age or older. The average household size was 2.09 and the average family size was 2.76.

The median age in the city was 23.3 years. 11.4% of residents were under the age of 18; 44.5% were between the ages of 18 and 24; 23% were from 25 to 44; 13.3% were from 45 to 64; and 7.9% were 65 years of age or older. The gender makeup of the city was 50.3% male and 49.7% female.

2000 census
As of the census of 2000, there were 69,291 people, 26,468 households, and 10,454 families residing in the city. The racial makeup of the city was 87.03% White, 4.24% African American, 0.29% Native American, 5.26% Asian, 0.07% Pacific Islander, 1.10% from other races, and 2.01% from two or more races. Hispanic or Latino of any race were 2.49% of the population. 22.9% were of German, 10.2% Irish, 9.1% English and 8.4% American ancestry according to Census 2000. 89.3% spoke English, 2.9% Spanish, 1.3% Korean, 1.1% German and 1.0% Chinese or Mandarin as their first language.

There were 26,468 households, out of which 17.9% had children under the age of 18 living with them, 29.2% were married couples living together, 7.8% had a female householder with no husband present, and 60.5% were non-families. 39.1% of all households were made up of individuals, and 7.1% had someone living alone who was 65 years of age or older. The average household size was 2.09 and the average family size was 2.76.

In the city, the population was spread out, with 12.7% under the age of 18, 42.3% from 18 to 24, 24.6% from 25 to 44, 12.6% from 45 to 64, and 7.9% who were 65 years of age or older. The median age was 23 years. For every 100 females, there were 94.4 males. For every 100 females age 18 and over, there were 92.8 males.

The median income for a household in the city was $25,377, and the median income for a family was $50,054. Males had a median income of $32,470 compared to $26,100 for females. The per capita income for the city was $16,481. About 10.3% of families and 29.6% of the population were below the poverty line, including 17.3% of those under age 18 and 7.6% of those age 65 or over.

Economy

The Bloomington and Monroe County region is home to major employers representing a diverse collection of fields, including education, the life sciences, advanced manufacturing and technology.

Bloomington is a regional economic center anchored by Indiana University and home to a diverse business community involved in pharmaceuticals, medical devices, technology, health care, and the arts. Bloomington's concentration of employment in the life sciences is six times greater than the U.S. average, and employment in the technology sector has grown by over 80 percent in recent years. Companies based in Bloomington include Cook Group, Author Solutions, OneWorld Enterprises, BloomingFoods, Bloomington Tutors, and Singota Solutions.

Bloomington has been recognized by Inc. Magazine as one of "America's Best Cities for Doing Business" and as one of Entrepreneur Magazine's Top 50 "Hottest Small Cities for Entrepreneurs". Additionally, Forbes Magazine ranked Bloomington No. 3 in its "Best Places for Business Careers" feature.

Education

Post-secondary education
 Indiana University
 Ivy Tech Community College

Elementary schools
 Arlington Heights Elementary School
 Bloomington Montessori School
 Childs Elementary School
 Clear Creek Elementary School
 Clear Creek Christian School
 Ellettsville Intermediate
 Ellettsville Primary
 Fairview Elementary School
 Grandview Elementary School
 Harmony School
 Highland Park Elementary School
 Lakeview Elementary School
 Lighthouse Christian Academy
 Marlin Elementary School
 Pinnacle School (K–12)
 Prep Academy
 The Project School (K–8)
 Rogers-Binford Elementary School
 St. Charles Catholic School
 Summit Elementary Schools
 Templeton Elementary School
 Unionville Elementary School
 University Elementary School
 Seven Oaks Classical School

Middle schools
 Batchelor Middle School
Edgewood Jr. High
 Harmony School
 Jackson Creek Middle School
 Lighthouse Christian Academy
 St. Charles Catholic School
 Tri-North Middle School

High schools
 Bloomington High School South
 Bloomington High School North
Edgewood High School 
 The Academy of Science and Entrepreneurship 
Bloomington Graduation School
 Harmony School
 Lighthouse Christian Academy

Others
 Bloomington has a public library, a branch of the Monroe County Public Library.
 MCCSC Adult Education

Media

Newspapers
 The Herald-Times
 Indiana Daily Student

Magazines
 Bloom Magazine

Television
 WTIU is a PBS station owned by Indiana University along with its sister radio station WFIU an NPR station.
 WTTV is licensed to Bloomington but is based out of Indianapolis as well as its sister station WXIN, which are both owned by Nexstar Media Group.

Bloomington also receives stations from Indianapolis and is part of the Indianapolis market.

A five-channel public-access television station is housed in the Monroe County Public Library. The station, known as Community Access Television Services or CATS, was established in 1973 and serves as a "dedicated constitutional forum". In April 1995, Rox, a program produced at CATS (then Bloomington Community Access Television, or BCAT), became the first TV series distributed via the web, with an episode titled "Global Village Idiots".

Radio stations
 W203BL 88.9 FM. Owned by and broadcasts Air 1 Radio Network, which is a Christian music radio station.
 W241CD 96.1 FM also called  Rock 96.1 The Quarry is a rock radio station that plays programming from Westwood One including "96 Rock" WFTK Cincinnati based morning hosts JD & Bridget. It's a sister station to WGCL and WTTS, which are also owned by Sarkes Tarzian, Inc. Tarzian was a prominent figure in town.
 WBWB 96.7 FM, also called B97, is a Top 40 radio station and it's a sister station to WHCC.
 WCLS 97.7 FM is the Local classic rock music station.
 WCYI 104.1 FM is an ultra low powered religious FM radio station broadcast out of St. Charles Borromeo Catholic Church.
 WFHB 91.3 and 98.1 in Bloomington, 100.7 in Nashville and 106.3 in Ellettsville. It's the Local Community radio station.
 WFIU 103.7 FM The NPR station in town. Owned by Indiana University.
 WGCL WGCL AM 1370 and 98.7 FM. WGCL is the local news talk radio station and is a sister station to WTTS and Rock 96.1 The Quarry.
 WHCC 105.1 FM, also called Hoosier Country 105, is a local country station which is also one of the flagship stations of Indiana Hoosiers Sports Network along with The Fan 1070 AM. Sister station to WBWB.
 WIUX 99.1 FM, The local student radio station of Indiana University. It is a low powered station.
 WMYJ 88.9 FM, also called MyJoy Radio, is a Southern Gospel radio station that is licensed to Oolitic, Indiana, and serves the Bloomington, Indiana area.
 WOMB 89.9 FM, also called With Our Mother Blessed, is a Christian radio station licensed to Ellettsville, Indiana.
 WTTS 92.3 FM is technically licensed to Trafalgar, Indiana. It transits to Bloomington and Indianapolis. It's an Adult Album Alternative station. Sister station to WGCL and Rock 96.1 The Quarry Owned by Sarkes Tarzian, Inc.
 WVNI 95.1 and 107.7 FM is also called spirit 95, which is a Christian contemporary music station broadcasting from Nashville, Indiana.

Transportation

Airports
 Monroe County Airport (no scheduled commercial flights)

Bicycling 
Bloomington is a gold-rated bicycle-friendly community by the League of American Bicyclists.  There are several significant bike trails in and around the city, most notably the B-Line Trail which runs north to south for almost four miles through the core of Downtown Bloomington and south through Switchyard Park.  An east to west version has also recently been completed along the 7th street corridor.

Bloomington and Indiana University briefly ran a dockless bikeshare program called Pace, launched in June 2018.  The program was cancelled after less than a year.

Highways
  
 
 
 
 
 

Bloomington, for many years was one of the largest cities without an interstate or freeway. However, interstate access finally occurred in December 2015 when the Interstate 69 expansion between Evansville and Indianapolis was completed to Bloomington.

The upgrading of SR 37 from a 4 Lane Highway to Interstate standards for the next section of I-69 between Bloomington and Martinsville was originally scheduled for completion in August 2016.  As of November 2018, the construction was substantially complete. The last section between Martinsville and Indianapolis is scheduled for completion in 2024.

State Road 45 (SR 45) and State Road 46 (SR 46) run through Bloomington together on a four-lane highway known as the "bypass".

State Road 48 (SR 48) starts as a four-lane highway on the city's west side before narrowing to two-lanes at Oard Rd outside the city limits.

Public transportation
Local bus service is provided by Bloomington Transit.

Bus service to Indianapolis is provided by Miller Transportation bus lines, services to the Indianapolis International Airport is provided through shuttle services such as GO Express.

Notable people

Note: This list does not include students attending Indiana University except for locals. Please see List of Indiana University (Bloomington) people for famous alumni.

 David Anspaugh, director of Hoosiers and Rudy
 Kenny Aronoff, drummer
 David Baker, symphonic jazz composer
 Tony Baldwin, college softball coach
 Dee Bradley Baker, voice actor
 Arija Bareikis, actress
 Paul Baribeau, folk punk singer and musician
 Joshua Bell, violinist
 Abraham Benrubi, actor
 Kent Benson, basketball player
 Diane Bish, organist, concert and recording artist, composer and conductor
 Lil Bub, famous cat, internet sensation
 Joseph O. Butcher, Major General in the Marine Corps
 Meg Cabot, author
 Hoagy Carmichael, singer-songwriter
 Calbert Cheaney, basketball player, assistant coach for the College Park Skyhawks
 Chris Clavin, singer-songwriter, Plan-It-X Records owner
 Terri Conn, actress
 William Cook, founder of Cook Inc.
 James Counsilman, US Olympic swimming coach
 John Merle Coulter, former president of Indiana University
 Malcolm Dalglish, hammered dulcimer player, composer, and choral director
 Grey Damon, actor
 John Darnielle, singer-songwriter
Krista Detor, musician
 Joe Dowell, singer-songwriter
Wilson V. Eagleson II, U.S. Army Air Force officer, decorated Tuskegee Airmen fighter pilot; raised in Bloomington. Son of IU's first African American woman graduate 
 Andy Fillmore, Canadian Member of Parliament for Halifax, Nova Scotia
 Mick Foley, former professional wrestler and author 
 Karen Joy Fowler, author
 Rex Grossman, former NFL quarterback
 David F. Hamilton, Judge on the United States Court of Appeals for the Seventh Circuit
 Bobby Helms, singer, “Jingle Bell Rock”, “My Special Angel”, “Fraulein”
 Jordan Hulls, basketball player
 Douglas Hofstadter, cognitive scientist
 Elaine Irwin Mellencamp, model
 Jared Jeffries, basketball player, Retired
 David Starr Jordan, former president of Indiana University and Stanford University
 Kraig Kinser, an ARCA driver
 Sheldon Kinser, Indy car driver
 Steve Kinser, race car driver
 Alfred Kinsey, founder of Kinsey Institute for Research in Sex, Gender and Reproduction
 Amelia Laskey, ornithologist
 Brad Leftwich, musician
 Ross Lockridge Jr., novelist, author of Raintree County
 Austin Lucas, singer-songwriter
 Sara Lund, musician
 Cory Martin, shot putter
 Sean May, former NBA basketball player
 John Mellencamp, musician
 Maurice Mierau, writer
 Denny Miller, actor
 Carrie Newcomer, musician
 Thubten Jigme Norbu, brother of Tenzin Gyatso, 14th Dalai Lama
 Elinor Ostrom, Nobel Prize–winner, political scientist
 Jeff Overton, PGA Tour golfer
 Angelo Pizzo, screenwriter and producer of Hoosiers and Rudy
 Kevin Pritchard, NBA front office executive
 Scott Rolen, former Major League Baseball player
 David Lee Roth, lead singer of band Van Halen
 Alfred Ryors, former president of Indiana University
 Jeff Sagarin, statistician for sports, contributor to USA Today
 Ronnie Schneider, ATP tennis player
 Frithjof Schuon, philosopher and mystic
 György Sebők, pianist
 János Starker, cellist
 John Strohm, singer, guitarist, and lawyer
 Sarkes Tarzian, engineer, inventor, and broadcaster
 Jill Bolte Taylor, neuroanatomist
 Herman B Wells, former president and chancellor of Indiana University
 Camilla Williams, opera singer
 Andrew Wylie, first president of Indiana University
 Max Zorn, mathematician

Points of interest
 The Bloomington Playwrights Project – produces only new plays by American playwrights
 Indiana University Bloomington
 Kinsey Institute for Research in Sex, Gender, and Reproduction (Bloomington)
 Lake Lemon - located approximately 10 miles northeast of Bloomington.
 Upland Brewing Company – the largest microbrewery in the state of Indiana.
Captain Janeway Birthplace Statue - Bloomington, Indiana is the birthplace of fictional Captain Kathryn Janeway, from the show Star Trek: Voyager.

Sister cities 
Bloomington has the following sister cities:

 Santa Clara, Villa Clara, Cuba
 Posoltega, Chinandega, Nicaragua

See also

List of public art in Bloomington, Indiana

References

External links

 City of Bloomington, Indiana website
 Greater Bloomington Chamber of Commerce
 Tourism Website
 

 
Cities in Indiana
Cities in Monroe County, Indiana
County seats in Indiana
Bloomington metropolitan area, Indiana
1818 establishments in Indiana